Acraea lygus, the lygus acraea, is a butterfly of the family Nymphalidae. The species was first described by Herbert Druce in 1875 from specimens collected by Joachim John Monteiro . It is found in south-west Africa, Botswana, Kenya, Zambia. In South Africa it is found from the savannah in Northern Cape to the Limpopo Province and the north-west provinces. It is an occasional migrant to Mpumalanga.

Description
Very close to Acraea stenobea q.v.
The wingspan is 48–55 mm for males and 50–56 mm for females.

Biology
Adults are on wing year round, but mainly from September to June.

Taxonomy
It is a member of the Acraea caecilia species group.
See also Pierre & Bernaud, 2014

References

External links

Die Gross-Schmetterlinge der Erde 13: Die Afrikanischen Tagfalter. Plate XIII 55 c

Butterflies described in 1875
lygus
Butterflies of Africa
Taxa named by Herbert Druce